Costas Evangelatos is a Greek artist and poet born in Argostoli in 1957 but he is originated by his father side from Lixouri, Kefalonia. He studied law at Athens University, painting and aesthetic theory of modern art in Manhattan (New York City). From 1986 until 1993 he was the artistic director of the DADA Gallery in Athens, and in 1990 founded the art group ART STUDIO "EST".

Along with painting, has worked internationally in the fields of Performance, Body art, Happening and Mail art. He has presented sections of his works in solo exhibitions in Athens, Rochester, New York, Thessaloniki, Arezzo, Avignon, Chantilly, Paris, Glasgow, Amsterdam, Nicosia.

He has participated in many group exhibitions and international artistic meetings in Barcelona, Warsaw, Seratz, Gothenburg, Amiens, Rome, Moscow, Santiago, Buenos Aires, New York, Los Angeles, etc. They have been published also books of him, aesthetic essays, poems in seven editions ("APOPEIRA" editions), lithographic works (bodygraphics) etc.

He has lectured on art issues in Greece and abroad. He is a member of scientific and artistic organizations and a senior member of the Greece's Chamber of Fine Arts.

His works are in collections of art, as in the Art Institute of the Central Bank of Greece, the "Museum of the City of Athens", the Gallery of the School of Philosophy in the University of Athens, the "ART" –Macedonian Fine Art Company, the Gallery of the Company of Macedonian Studies, the Municipal Gallery of Athens, the American College of Greece (ACG ART COLLECTION), the Photographic Archive of the Benaki Museum, the headquarters of Army Navy, the Foundation of Archbishop Makarios in Nicosia, the Patriarchate of Alexandria, the Reading Society of Corfu, the Ionian University, the Municipal Gallery of Corfu, the Greek Embassy in France, the Greek and Cypriot Consulate in Paris, the University FORDHAM of New York etc.

Kimon Friar translated in English, when Evangelatos was in the States, some emotional poems of him from the collection Alea Prosomoion published under the title In the small mirror (2003) in Greece (APOPEIRA editions).

External links
https://web.archive.org/web/20110429175353/http://www.gisi.gr/evangelatos/
http://www.naftemporiki.gr/news/pstory.asp?id=1924780
https://web.archive.org/web/20110727195214/http://www.protothema.gr/life-style/politismos/article/?aid=91902
https://web.archive.org/web/20101224011644/http://www.fifo.gr/index.php/2010/12/%CE%B6%CF%89%CE%B3%CF%81%CE%B1%CF%86%CE%B9%CE%BA%CF%8C-%CE%AD%CF%81%CE%B3%CE%BF-%CF%84%CE%BF%CF%85-%CE%BA%CF%8E%CF%83%CF%84%CE%B1-%CE%B5%CF%85%CE%B1%CE%B3%CE%B3%CE%B5%CE%BB%CE%AC%CF%84%CE%BF%CF%85/
https://web.archive.org/web/20120319094559/http://www.artingreece.gr/artnews.php?ID=765
https://web.archive.org/web/20120322165226/http://www.kostasbeys.gr/articles.php?s=3&mid=1096&mnu=1&id=1196
https://web.archive.org/web/20110719063732/http://www.amb-grece.fr/grece_en_france/expositions.htm
https://web.archive.org/web/20110724131921/http://www1.rizospastis.gr/wwwengine/story.do?id=4743870&textCriteriaClause=+%CE%95%CE%A5%CE%91%CE%93%CE%93%CE%95%CE%9B%CE%91%CE%A4%CE%9F%CE%A5++%CE%9A%CE%A9%CE%A3%CE%A4%CE%91
https://web.archive.org/web/20110723011603/http://www.acgart.gr/ACG-COLLECTION/ARTISTS/E/EvaC/EvaC-bio.htm
https://web.archive.org/web/20110822150919/http://www.fkth.gr/evagelatos.htm
https://web.archive.org/web/20110904151110/http://www.athensdowntownart.com/%CE%9A%CF%8E%CF%83%CF%84%CE%B1%CF%82_%CE%95%CF%85%CE%B1%CE%B3%CE%B3%CE%B5%CE%BB%CE%AC%CF%84%CE%BF%CF%82/product.aspx?id=-1&pid=360

Greek artists
Living people
Greek painters
Year of birth missing (living people)
People from Argostoli